Duval Mba Wapiwo (born 20 January 2000) is a Cameroonian football player who currently plays for ES Sétif.

Wapiwo joined USL Championship side North Carolina FC on loan for their 2019 season. After playing two games with NCFC in the 2019 U.S. Open Cup, Wapiwo made his league debut in a game against Loudoun United FC on July 17, 2019.

On January 7, 2020, he joined USL Championship side Sporting Kansas City II on loan.

In 2022, he joined ES Sétif.

References

External links

2000 births
Living people
Cameroonian footballers
Cameroonian expatriate footballers
North Carolina FC players
Sporting Kansas City II players
Association football midfielders
USL Championship players